Echium virescens is a flowering plant in the genus Echium. It is endemic to the island of Tenerife, mainly in Macizo de Anaga and the Orotava Valley. It grows in forests and on lower south slopes of the island.

Description

It is a herbaceous plant and grows up to 2 m in height and requires plenty of sun and good drainage. It is a branched, bushy plant. It grows in rosettes with several dense and cylindrical inflorescences. These tops are forked, unlike the Echium webbii of the island of La Palma, that has simple lateral tops. It has dense foliage with green-grey leaves. These are thick and persistent, lanceolate, at the base, and smaller throughout the inflorescence, with hairs on both sides.

It has pale blue or pink flowers from the end of winter to the beginning of spring. The sepals of the flowers are fused at the base.

Uses
This plant is used in gardens.  The plant are used for beekeeping, as it is rich in pollen and nectar.

External links

  Echium virescens and other flowers of Tenerife

virescens
Flora of the Canary Islands